Schwandorf is a Landkreis (district) in Upper Palatinate in the eastern part of Bavaria, Germany. Neighboring districts are (from the east clockwise) Cham, Regensburg, Neumarkt, Amberg-Sulzbach, Neustadt an der Waldnaab, and the Czech Plzeň Region.

Geography

The main rivers of the district are the Naab and the Regen.

Climate
The Climate in this area has mild differences between highs and lows, and there is adequate rainfall year-round.  The Köppen Climate Classification subtype for this climate is "Cfb". (Marine West Coast Climate/Oceanic climate).

History
The district was created in 1972 by merging the previous districts of Burglengenfeld, Oberviechtach, Nabburg, Neunburg vorm Wald, and the previously district-free city Schwandorf.

Coat of arms
The coat of arms shows the lion of the Palatinate to the left. The tower in the right half symbolizes the many fortresses and castles in the district. The wavy line and the mill wheel in the bottom stand for the many rivers and the water mills in the district.

Politics 
Schwandorf (electoral district)

Towns and municipalities

References

External links

 Official website (German)
 Schwandorf – pictures, sights, day trips

 
Districts of Bavaria